Silver Leppik (born 31 March 1983) is an Estonian retired professional basketball player. Standing at 1.85 m (6 ft 1 in), he played at the shooting guard position. He was a member of the Estonia national basketball team in 2005 and 2011.

Awards and accomplishments

Professional career
University of Tartu
 4× Estonian League champion: 2004, 2007, 2008, 2010
 5× Estonian Cup champion: 2002, 2004, 2009, 2010, 2011
 BBL Cup champion: 2010

External links
 Profile at ESBL 

1983 births
Living people
People from Jõgeva Parish
Estonian men's basketball players
Korvpalli Meistriliiga players
Point guards
Tartu Ülikool/Rock players
KK Pärnu players